Clareview station is an Edmonton Light Rail Transit station in Edmonton, Alberta, Canada. It serves the Capital Line and is currently the northern terminus of the line. It is a ground-level station located near 42 Street and 139 Avenue, and is named for the northeast Edmonton district of Clareview.

As of 2018, it is the northernmost rail transit station in North America, being at approximately the same latitude as Dublin, Ireland, Manchester, England, and Hamburg, Germany.

History
The station was opened on April 26, 1981.

Major renovations to the station were completed on March 4, 2001. These renovations included a new covered station platform, two bus terminals, the addition of wheelchair ramps at station entrances, and a pedestrian underpass connecting the station to both bus terminals.

Station layout
The station has a 123 metre long centre loading platform that can accommodate two five-car LRT trains at the same time, with one train on each side of the platform.  The platform is just over nine metres wide.

Clareview Station has a park and ride facility with 1372 parking spaces.

Public art
Clareview Station is decorated with a piece entitled "One Long Autumn", a gel transfer onto plexiglass imitating sepia prints.

Around the station
Clareview Town Centre
Northeast Community Health Centre
York

Clareview Transit Centre

The Clareview Transit Centre is located on the east (known as "East Clareview") and west (known as "West Clareview") sides of the LRT station. The sides are connected to the station by a pedestrian underpass, that also connects to the LRT station. This transit centre features many amenities including park and ride, bike racks, passenger drop off area, large shelter and pay phone. The LRT station adjacent includes a snack shop and washrooms.

The following bus routes serve the transit centre:

West:

East:

The above list does not include LRT services from the adjacent LRT station.

References

External links

Edmonton Light Rail Transit stations
Railway stations in Canada opened in 1981
Edmonton Transit Service transit centres
Capital Line